Live in Central Park is a DVD by Diana Ross released in 2012 that followed from a July 21, 1983 concert in The Great Lawn of New York City's Central Park, which was cut short by a massive lightning storm. The concert was staged as a benefit to raise funds for a children's park, later known as the Diana Ross Playground, located inside the park at West 81st Street and Central Park West. 

The concerts were aired worldwide on the Showtime cable network as For One and For All, and directed by Steve Binder. That concert lasted 45 minutes before the storm. Winds of nearly 50 mph were reported, and electrical power was disrupted for nearly 40,000 homes throughout the NYC metropolitan area during the storm. On July 22, 1983, the New York City Parks Department determined that the ground was dry enough for the crowd to stand on for a second concert, which began at 6pm that evening.  

While the concert did not ultimately make a profit due to a number of factors, groundbreaking for the Diana Ross Playground took place in September 1986 after Ross made a personal donation.

These two concerts were part of the Up Front Tour to promote Ross's 1983 album.

TV Land awarded Most Memorable Television Performance in 2006, ABC Network chose it as one of the Top 20 Television Performances and VH1's 100 Greatest Moments on TV.

In 2019, the concert was re-aired as part of Diana Ross: Her Life, Love and Legacy for Ross' 75th birthday.

Set list 

"I'm Coming Out"
"Home"
"Family"

"It's My House"
"Let's Go Up"
"Reach Out and Touch (Somebody's Hand)"
"Reflections"/"Baby Love"/"Stop! In the Name of Love"/"Love Is Like an Itching in My Heart"
"Pieces of Ice"
"Lady Sings the Blues"/"Ain't Nobody 's Business"
"I Cried for You"

"God Bless the Child"

"Mirror, Mirror"
"Maniac"

"You Can't Hurry Love"
"Upside Down"
"So Close"
"Why Do Fools Fall in Love"

"Ribbon in the Sky"

"Beat It"
/Muscles
"Endless Love"
"Theme From Mahogany"/"Ain't No Mountain High Enough"

"All for One"

References

Diana Ross video albums
2012 video albums
Showtime (TV network) original programming
1983 American television episodes
Television shows directed by Steve Binder
Central Park